Pacey John Witter (born 1983) is a fictional character in the WB television drama Dawson's Creek. He is a principal character in all six seasons of the series and is portrayed by actor Joshua Jackson.

Background
Pacey Witter is a sarcastic, underachieving 15-year-old boy at the start of the series. Constantly labeled by his family as a "black sheep", he has a distant relationship with his emotionally abusive parents. He has considered Dawson Leery his best friend since his childhood and would often rely on him when family issues arose. Pacey has also known Joey Potter through their mutual friendship with Dawson, though they are initially only friends because of Dawson and would occasionally get on each other's nerves.

Character arc

Season 1
In season one, 15-year-old Pacey is introduced as Dawson's inconsequent best friend and somewhat of a “Bad Boy" type. He falls in love and loses his virginity to his English teacher, Tamara Jacobs (Leann Hunley). When Pacey relays the details of his sexual encounter with Ms. Jacobs to Dawson in a school bathroom, the conversation is overheard by another boy smoking marijuana in the next stall. Rumors quickly begin to spread about the nature of Pacey's relationship with the 36-year-old teacher and the ensuing scandal eventually forces Ms. Jacobs to end their relationship and leave town.

Following his relationship with Tamara, Pacey spends most of his time hanging out with Jen, Dawson and Joey, with who he always had an antagonistic relationship. Forced to partner on a biology project, Pacey and Joey spend a whole day together and Pacey finds himself romantically interested in Joey. He realizes that maybe he could like her and asks Dawson if he can ask Joey out, which forces Dawson to assess his own feelings toward Joey. Pacey kisses Joey, but she turns him down. Pacey also comically enters a beauty pageant and performs a skit from Braveheart.

Season 2
In season two, Pacey wants to reinvent himself, dying his hair and trying to get close to his longtime crush, Kristy Livingstone, which unfortunately does not work out. He decides to throw his 16th birthday party at the docks in an effort to change the general perception of him, but is dismal as nobody knows it's his party and Dawson forgets his birthday altogether  – luckily Dawson realizes this and later makes up for it. Pacey goes through a radical change when he meets Andie McPhee, an academic overachiever who is new to Capeside. They come out of the gate sparring and slowly develop a romance, though this progress is halted when Pacey's ex-girlfriend, Tamara, returns to Capeside. Pacey and Tamara kiss, but ultimately part ways and Pacey is able to finally get some closure. Pacey's low self-esteem is boosted by the support and encouragement Andie gives him, and he slowly starts believing that he can do whatever he wishes in life and is able to improve academically.

Pacey and Andie get together and she offers to help Pacey reform his study habits and Pacey begins to do well in school, achieving his first-ever A. The two grow closer, embarking on a sexual relationship as well. Pacey is, at first, overcome with emotion by all of these changes to his life and the lack of predictability that had become the only stable force in his life. Even though it terrifies him, he comes to terms with how important Andie is to him and how much he loves her. His recent inspiration for changing his life also makes the psychological abuse of his family all the more straining, which culminates in a fishing trip Pacey and Dawson take with their fathers – and Jack, who Pacey invites along in spite of Dawson's jealousy and subsequent ire. Pacey spends the entire trip doing his best to do as his father tells him and stay out of harms way, but is constantly berated for his efforts. At the end of the trip Pacey catches a big fish and wins a competition upon their return to Capeside, but his father manages to ruin the victory by telling Pacey that he probably won't have many more moments like that.

As Andie's mental health begins to suffer due to the strain of caring for her mother and the death of her eldest brother Tim, Pacey becomes concerned for her and their future and struggles with what he can do to help Andie. Eventually the pressure is too much for Andie and she breaks up with Pacey, who is adamant that he not push her away at a time where she needs him and he tells her that he loves her for the first time. Andie begins to hallucinate that she is seeing her deceased brother, and suffers a nervous breakdown. She takes a leave of absence at the end of the season for a stay in a mental health facility. The strained relationship Pacey has with his neglectful and alcoholic father is further explored this season, as well as the effect Andie has on that relationship. When Andie leaves for the mental health facility to get better, Pacey misses her terribly and his abrasive father makes a snide comment about Andie being crazy, for which Pacey hits him. Near the end of the season, Andie tells Pacey's father over the phone to give Pacey a hug for her, and his father does. This ultimately leads to a touching moment — it seems that they can start to put their past behind them and, for the first time, Pacey looks for some support from his father and actually gets it.

Season 3
After a summer apart, Pacey is anxiously awaiting the return of Andie, all the while encouraging Dawson to make things happen with Eve. After Dawson rejects Joey he asks Pacey to look out for her for a while. Wanting to surprise Andie, Pacey brings Joey along to pick Andie up early at the facility where she has been treated over the summer. Andie acts very distant and eventually tells Pacey that she had an affair and, devastated, he breaks up with her. Pacey buys a wrecked boat and starts work on restoring it, occupying himself with the project to get over Andie. Andie starts dating a guy who ends up attacking her and this briefly brings her and Pacey together, though he then tells her that they cannot get back together, he doesn't love her like that anymore.

After Pacey is deemed a failure again by his family, he pursues a purely sexual relationship with Jen. Both agree that there will be no emotion involved whatsoever. While trapped on Witch Island with Joey, Dawson, and Jen, the two proceed to make out in the condemned church, which seems to be haunted by the spirits of 13 girls who were burned alive there in the 1600s. They keep trying to hook up again in the following days, but something always interrupts them.

Dawson returns home from a dentist appointment and almost catches Pacey and Jen having sex in his room- He finds Pacey on his bedroom floor apparently playing a video game, while Jen is gone. Dawson finds a condom on the floor and gets suspicions about who it is that Pacey is seeing. Meanwhile, Pacey and Joey start to take dancing lessons to win a scholarship. Dawson and Jen later join Joey and Pacey in ballroom dancing, and Dawson assumes that Pacey is sleeping with Joey. When he and Joey find Pacey and Jen making out in the coat closet of the ballroom studio, everyone is shocked. Joey overreacts and Jen suspects Joey likes Pacey. Pacey tells Jen that there's nothing going on between Joey and him, but they still decide they are better off as friends.

After failing grades, Pacey has to complete an English Class project – starring in a school production of Barefoot in the Park. Coincidentally, Andie is the Assistant Director of the play and they eventually manage to work well on the project together. Although semi-coerced into doing the play, Pacey eventually finds that he enjoys it and has fun playing the character of Paul. After the show, he and Andie talk a bit and mend fences, deciding to start anew as friends.

As the season progresses, Pacey realizes he may have feelings for Joey, which worries him. He gets into a fight with a bully who admits to vandalizing a mural Joey paints for the school, and as punishment, he is assigned to mentor a young, neglected boy with a rebellious attitude not unlike Pacey's.

To encourage Joey's art, Pacey rents her a wall. He eventually acts on his feelings and kisses Joey. She reacts furiously to the possible implications on their friendships. Pacey is also extremely concerned about the possible demise of his friendship with Dawson due to his feelings for Joey. He attempts to tell Dawson during a camping trip but chickens out.

Pacey's childhood friend, Will Krudski, comes along on a spring break visit to Dawson's Aunt Gwen in Stolen Kisses. While there Pacey and Joey feel tense and uncomfortable. Joey eventually admits to Pacey that she felt a spark when he touched her. Pacey counts to 10 and kisses her. However, Dawson's aunt interrupts the kiss. Later that night they both confess their feelings for each other, both saying that even though it's tearing them apart they can't get rid of it.

When Dawson accidentally learns of Pacey and Joey's burgeoning relationship from Jen weeks after it begins, he reacts furiously to what he feels is Pacey's betrayal. He ends his friendship with Pacey and forces Joey to choose between them. Joey breaks up with Pacey out of loyalty to her best friend and her hope to limit the fallout to the trio’s long-standing friendship. Despite this, Dawson refuses to forgive Pacey.

During the Anti-prom, Pacey goes with Andie as his date, and Joey goes with Dawson. She gets uncomfortable with the situation, and Jack encourages her to attempt to set an example for Dawson and Pacey. She asks Pacey to dance with her, infuriating Dawson and leading to another fight.

Pacey decides to leave Capeside and spend the summer sailing, but when Joey learns about his plans, she calls him out for giving up. After realizing that Joey was right, he paints "ask me to stay" on Joey's wall. The next day, at the wedding of Dawson's parents, Joey tells Pacey that she cannot give him a reason to stay because she still has to work through her feelings. After Dawson realizes that Joey is unhappy, he reluctantly accepts her feelings and tells her to go and that she was free. She leaves him, and Dawson breaks down sobbing on the docks. Joey races to find Pacey before he sets sail and tells him that she is in love with him and wants to go with him for the summer. Pacey and Joey then leave Capeside for the summer on his boat, the True Love.

Season 4
Pacey and Joey return from their summer at sea and are still madly in love, although Joey's desire to repair her friendship with Dawson leaves Pacey concerned, and they fight as a result. They make-up, although the issue isn’t put to rest and continues to concern him.

At this point his own relationship with Dawson has been irrevocably damaged, and neither has any interest in repairing it. Pacey's older sister, Gretchen, returns to Capeside from college and they move in together into a beach house that Gretchen rents.

Pacey and Joey adjust to life back in Capeside as a couple. Pacey continues to struggle with school. The new couple begins to struggle with the possibilities of their future outside of Capeside.

Pacey grows increasingly concerned with Joey's constant desire to rebuild her friendship with Dawson and prioritize his feelings over their relationship. After Dawson saves his life during a storm, he begins to recognize his heartache at the loss of his oldest friendship and apologizes to Dawson. The two later join forces with Jack to prank the principal and set up their troublemaking-classmate Drue, increasing Pacey's hope for eventually recovering their friendship.

Pacey suspects that Joey may be concerned about the kiss that they witnessed between Dawson and Gretchen at the annual Leery Christmas dinner. Joey denies this at first but eventually tells Pacey that she doesn't know why she is bothered. She also tells him that whenever she's around Dawson, she feels that she is reverting back to her fifteen-year-old self. Pacey encourages her to talk to Dawson. After talking with Dawson, Joey assures Pacey that all ghosts have been resolved.

During their senior class ski trip, Pacey and Joey finally consummate their relationship. Pacey is concerned by Joey's behavior the next morning and he tries to get her to communicate with him, which upsets Joey. They eventually make-up and Joey tells Pacey that she is glad that they slept together. After Dawson asks Joey about the state of her virginity, she lies and tells him that she has not slept with Pacey. Gretchen finds out that Joey lied to Dawson, and Joey asks Gretchen not to tell Pacey anything. However, Gretchen tells Pacey the truth. Joey's dishonesty appears to have worried Pacey, but he chooses not to confront her about it. Joey eventually comes clean to Dawson after she felt that she had to tell him the truth since he offered to pay for her college tuition. She also tells Pacey that she lied and he appears to be understanding of the situation, telling her that what's important is that she finally told the truth.

Towards the end of the season, Pacey and Joey begin having difficulties stemming from their futures beyond high school. Believing that he's holding Joey back and growing frustrated with himself and his lack of prospects beyond high school, Pacey eventually explodes at their senior prom, which results to the end of his relationship with Joey. They are both devastated, sending Pacey into a downward spiral and Joey throwing herself back into her renewed friendship with Dawson.

The season ends with Pacey managing to graduate high school at the last second, and taking a job on a yacht and leaving Capeside once again. He breaks off contact with Joey but eventually calls Dawson on his last day in Capeside, attempting once again to mend fences.

Season 5
After working as a deckhand on a yacht all summer following graduation from high school, Pacey settles in Boston and takes a job working as a chef in a fancy restaurant, Civilization. When Jen discovers that he's in town Pacey asks her not to tell the others, but Joey sees him at the restaurant. They share a sweet reunion on Pacey's boat, as friends. Pacey has a relationship with one of the waitresses at Civilization, Karen. This turns out to be problematic as she is having an affair with the head chef, Danny, a married man that Pacey considers a mentor.

Pacey returns to Capeside after hearing the news of the death of Mitch Leery. He learns that Joey and Dawson’s reignited complicated relationship has resurfaced, and reassures Joey that he understands. He later attempts to console Dawson and help him deal with the guilt that he feels about his father's death by taking him out to the site of Mitch’s accident and relaying the true circumstances of his death.

He and Audrey (Joey's roommate) become interested in each other and quickly embark on a physical relationship. During the gang's spring break trip to Florida, Audrey and Pacey decide to make their relationship official. Pacey's mentor, Danny, leaves Civilization and a new manager, Alex Pearl (Sherilyn Fenn), takes over. Alex alienates the restaurant staff causing Pacey to lead a walk-out en masse during a meeting with local investors to protest Alex's management policies. As a result, the restaurant is shut down and both Pacey and Alex are fired. As summer approaches, Pacey returns to Capeside to work as a security guard at the Capeside Yacht Club, but leaves to attempt to rekindle things with Audrey. He eventually convinces her to take him back and the two drive cross-country to Audrey's home in L.A.

Season 6
Pacey finds financial success as a stockbroker in Boston, which is set up by Audrey's father. He moves in with Jack and a girl named Emma. Audrey breaks things off with him, after she hears him confessing to Emma that he doesn't think he ever loved her. Later in the season, during Christmas in Capeside, Audrey confronts Dawson, Joey and Pacey for never dealing with their past and by consequence never growing up.

Joey and Pacey share a drunken kiss at his apartment during a party. After being locked overnight in a K-Mart together, they discuss their past and current relationship. How they feel uncomfortable talking about sex with each other or how they never discuss their past and how the fact they never had closure impacts them. In an intimate moment Joey shaves his beard. When they go to sleep she tells him a fantasy she had when she was a teenager. In the fantasy they would be castaways in an idyllic island, living their love away from everyone. They share a kiss after her confession. Each admits that they miss the other. However, they don't stay together because Joey's boyfriend comes back from a trip. She tells Pacey the timing doesn't feel right and decides to not pursue her feelings for him. Soon, she realizes things are not working with Eddie and the best thing for her is to spend sometime alone thinking about her life, what leads to her going on a personal journey as an independent woman and finally going to Paris.

Afterwards, Pacey somewhat makes amends with his estranged father when he visits him in Capeside after his father suffers a mild heart attack. With Pacey's father too sick to work anymore because of multiple health problems from his life-long alcoholism, Pacey's brother, Doug, takes over as acting police chief of Capeside. While working as a stockbroker, Pacey clashes several times with his slick, arrogant boss, Rich Renaldi (Dana Ashbrook).

Pacey and Dawson continue to rebuild their friendship, and Dawson trusts Pacey with the savings he intends to use to film his latest feature. Pacey jumps at the chance to impress Dawson and strengthen their friendship but invests all of the money in a single stock and talks Dawson out of taking the funds out when he has made a profit. His life comes crashing down when loses his and Dawson’s money in the bio-tech stock bust, and is later fired after asking Rich to loan him enough money to reimburse Dawson, which leads to a fight when Rich taunts Pacey.

Pacey eventually comes clean to Dawson. This devastates Dawson and reignites their years-long fight, in which Dawson articulates the demise of their friendship stemmed from Pacey choosing his romantic intentions over his duties as a friend. They both acknowledge the friendship is unlikely to recover and part ways, devastated.

Pacey returns to Capeside and temporarily moves in with Doug, giving in to depression. After Joey resurrects Dawson's film and convinces Pacey to step-up and begin making amends for his actions, Pacey begins lessening his debt by raising what money he can from local business owners to start paying Dawson back. Pacey and Joey meet one last time, and they acknowledge their need to move on. Pacey attempts to pass along the money he has collected for Dawson, but Joey decides it is about time for Pacey and Dawson to work out their issues without her in the middle and refuses.

Later, Pacey and Dawson are both tricked into meeting up by Joey; Pacey passes on the money he has collected. They discuss the circumstances of the destruction of their friendship and acknowledge the rift might not be irreparable.

Series finale

Five years later, a 25-year-old Pacey is now the proprietor of The Icehouse, a successful restaurant in Capeside bearing the same name as the one Joey's family used to operate. Even though he's a successful chef, he feels empty and he's still unhappy. He is having an affair with a married woman.

On the occasion of Gale Leery's wedding, everyone returns to Capeside. The five friends reunite at Pacey's restaurant to reminisce about the past. Dawson is nearing the end of production of his semi-autographical tv series 'The Creek', of which Pacey has posters hung at his restaurant. Joey is now a junior editor living in New York and she is in a serious relationship with a writer.

During Gail's wedding reception, Pacey kisses Joey (reigniting lingering feelings between the two), but the moment is interrupted when Jen collapses. It is later discovered that Jen has a deadly heart condition. The two spend time together in Capeside while Jen is hospitalized. In the midst of their romantic entanglements, Joey, Dawson, Jack, and Pacey are brought together at the Ice House to say goodbye to Jen, who dies from pulmonary congestion.

At the same time, Joey ends her relationship with her boyfriend after Jen tells her that her dying wish is to Joey to stop running and declare her desires. She reiterated her love for Dawson; she acknowledges that he is her soulmate who is tied to her childhood, a love that is pure and eternally innocent. She also cannot deny that the love she has for Pacey is real and has kept her running from it. Before she can elaborate, the two are interrupted.

In the epilogue, it is revealed that Joey and Pacey are watching Dawson's semi-autobiographical television series The Creek in her apartment in New York City, appearing to have reignited their relationship. They excitedly call up Dawson together, apparently having restored their rift and strengthened the relationship between the trio of childhood friends.

They congratulate Dawson and are delighted to discover he is going to meet his hero, Steven Spielberg, the following day. The series ends with Pacey, his girlfriend, and his on-and-off best friend conversing over the phone as the camera pans to a photograph of the three with Jen.

Notable relationships
Tamara Jacobs
 Fling
 Beginning: "Pilot" (1.01)
 Broke Up: "Baby" (1.06)
 Reason: Tamara leaves town after their illegal liaison after Pacey accidentally leaks the news to the school.
Andie Mcphee
 Girlfriend
First Relationship:
Beginning: "The Dance" (2.06)
End: "Homecoming" (3.02)
Reason: Andie cheated on Pacey while at the clinic.
 Kiss
 "Secrets and lies" (3.06)
Jen Lindley
 Fling
 Beginning: "Escape from Witch Island" (3.07)
 Broke Up: "Four To Tango" (3.09)
 Reason: They feel they're better off as friends and don't have sexual chemistry.
Joey Potter
 Kissed
"Double Date" (1.10)
"Cinderella Story" (3.17)
"Neverland" (3.18)
Boyfriend
First Relationship:
Beginning: "Stolen Kisses" (3.19)
End: "The Longest Day" (3.20)
Reason: Dawson gives her an ultimatum and she chooses their friendship over Pacey.
Second Relationship:
Beginning: "True Love" (3.23)
End: "Promicide" (4.20)
Reason: Pacey breaks up with Joey during their senior prom.
Third Relationship:
Beginning: Castaways" (6.15)
End: "Love Bites" (6.18)
Reason: Joey chooses her college boyfriend over Pacey.
Fourth Relationship:
Beginning: ...Must Come To An End" (6.24)
Note: Jen tells Joey her final wish is for Joey to stop running. Jen's death motivates Joey to reunite with Pacey.
Audrey Liddell
 Girlfriend
 Beginning: "Guerilla Filmmaking" (5.14)
 Broke Up: "Living Dead Girl" (6.06)
 Reason: She overhears Pacey telling Emma that he doesn't think he ever loved her.
Emma Jones	
 Kissed
"Everything Put Together Falls Apart" (6.09)

Reception
First introduced as Dawson's best male friend and comic relief, Pacey starts to appear as a romantic hero through the course of season two. The second season explores Pacey's relationship with new girl in town Andie McPhee, as well as his relationship with his abusive father and the impact it has on his self-esteem. Creator Kevin Williamson says that he saw season two as a "sort of An Officer and a Gentleman storyline where the season really became Pacey's Pond" and "he started to care about himself and made an effort to be a better person for the love of a good woman and ultimately for himself".

Season three focused on building a romantic triangle featuring Pacey competing with Dawson for the affections of Joey, a story line that is frequently hailed by critics as one of the best love triangles in television drama. Addressing season three's arc, showrunner Greg Berlanti says, "I would get Pacey with Joey and have a King Arthur–esque story — Dawson being King Arthur — exploring what happens when Lancelot and Guinevere fall in love. [Joey and Pacey] always had such wonderful chemistry, the two of them — they have a Tracy and Hepburn quality that I liked writing for." The story reignited interest in the show and the love triangle would serve as a driving plot line through the series' final episode.

Joshua Jackson was acclaimed for his charismatic performance. In a retrospective review for The Guardian, critic Jonathan Bernstein said "not only did Joshua Jackson have more credible chemistry with Katie Holmes, whom he briefly dated in real life, but Pacey quickly eclipsed Dawson as both the series’ most relatable character and its moral centre." Jezebel said "their screwball dynamic, coupled with actors Katie Holmes and Joshua Jackson’s untapped chemistry and an intricately plotted courtship subverted everything expected of the show. It unsurprisingly still resonates with so many millennial women who grew up watching the series. There was a time when we had come for the angst, but now we were staying for the romance." Jackson was the only Dawson's Creek cast member to win a Teen Choice Award three times, for Choice Actor in a TV Drama Series.

Pacey's eventual relationship with Joey was credited with injecting energy into the show when it was struggling in the ratings. They were included in TV Guide's list of "The Best TV Couples of All Time" and on BuzzFeed's "19 Friends-To-Lovers TV Couples That Stole Fans' Hearts" list. Harper's Bazaar ranked them at number 7 in their "70 of the Best TV Couples of All Time" list. Entertainment Weekly also ranked Pacey and Joey as number 20 on their list of the 100 Best TV Romances of All Time.

References

Fictional characters from Massachusetts
Dawson's Creek characters
Fictional writers
Television characters introduced in 1998
Teenage characters in television
Fictional victims of child sexual abuse
Fictional victims of domestic abuse